Zakerzonia (Trans-Curzonia) is an informal name for the territories of Poland to the west of the Curzon Line which used to have sizeable Ukrainian populations, including significant Lemko, Boyko  populations, before the invasion of Poland by the Soviet Union and Nazi Germany in 1939, and were claimed as ethnically Ukrainian territories by Ukrainian nationalists in the aftermath of World War II. However, before 1939, the areas of Zakerzonia were mostly inhabited by Poles, who constituted about 70% of the population of this area. Ukrainians lived in a minority in Zakerzonia, constituting about 20% of the area's population.

"Zakerzonia" stands for "territory beyond the Curzon line", or in Ukrainian "Zakerzons'kyi krai".

The Ukrainian Insurgent Army (UPA), at the height of their control of the territories, claimed plans of creation of Transcurzon Republic.

The demography of Zakerzonia drastically changed by forcible resettlement of the Ukrainians, with ethnic cleansing operations being the resettlement of Ukrainians from Poland to the Soviet Union (1944–1946) and Operation Vistula (1947). Therefore, Poles today constitute over 95% of the population of Zakerzonia.

Ukrainians in Poland: 1939–1950
Pyotr Eberhardt estimates that in 1939 the number of Ukrainians between the Curzon Line and Oder-Neisse Line was 657,500 people.

Timothy Snyder gives a similar estimate of up to 700,000 Ukrainians or Ukrainian-language speakers lived in Poland immediately after World War II within the new borders. They were a "demographic majority in many areas along a long border strip running from Chełm almost to Kraków". His data, however, are not considered reliable, because, for example, the area near Kraków, Tarnów, Rzeszów, Zamość and others has been purely Polish for centuries.

In 1946, only 220,200 Ukrainians were left in Poland, which had further decreased to 150,000 by 1950.

References

 
Aftermath of World War II in Poland
Poland in World War II
Poland–Ukraine relations
Poland–Soviet Union relations
Ukrainian irredentism
Ukrainian-speaking countries and territories
Regions of Poland